Patti Flynn (born Patricia Maude Young, 1937 – 10 September 2020) was a jazz singer, author, model and social activist. She was a founder and patron of Black History Wales. In 2019 she was honoured with the Ethnic Minority Welsh Women Achievement Association's (EMWWAA) Lifetime Achievement Award.

Early life

Patti Flynn was born Patricia Maude Young in 1937 in  Sophia Street, Cardiff. She was the youngest child of seven to Wilmott George Young and Beatrice Young (née Silver). Her father was merchant seaman from Jamaica and her mother was from Cardiff. Her father came to Cardiff during the 1920s and during the Second World War he lost his life when his boat was torpedoed.

When she was one year old, the family moved to 40 Pomeroy Street and she later attended St. Mary's School in Clarence Road, Cardiff. The family also lived in North Church Street, which is close to the Church of St Mary the Virgin and St Stephen the Martyr in Butetown.

She went on to have a career as a jazz singer, and was a contemporary of Shirley Bassey, who was also born in the area of Tiger Bay. She was also an author, radio actress and was co-founder of the Butetown Bay Jazz Festival.

Later life and death

In later life she lived in the Cardiff suburb of Fairwater

She campaigned valiantly for 26 years to have a monument erected and together in 2019, Patti Flynn, Uzo Iwobi and Race Council Cymru worked with Deputy Minister and Chief Whip Jane Hutt MS, Cllr Susan Elsmore, Cardiff Council, Royal Commonwealth Society Wales, British Legion and British Armed Forces represented by Colonel Jonah MacGill and the stone masons organised to have the monument installed. Patti Flynn wrote the words on the face of the monument and in so doing ensured that her legacy and the selfless sacrifice of Black, Asian and Minority Ethnic service men and women in Wales will never be extinguished". - Black History Wales

In 2019 she was honoured with the Ethnic Minority Welsh Women Achievement Association's (EMWWAA) Lifetime Achievement Award, at the same time as her friend Humie Webbe who also won awards. She was also a founder and patron of Black History Wales.

Patti Flynn died of cancer on 10 September 2020, aged 83 years.

Bibliography

 Fractured Horizon: A Landscape of Memory/Gorwel Briwedig: Tirlun Atgof  2003

Discography

Album

Singles

References

External links
Patti Flynn talking about her life to Diverse Cymru

1937 births
2020 deaths
20th-century Black British women singers
20th-century Welsh women singers
People from Butetown
Musicians from Cardiff
Welsh people of Jamaican descent
British women jazz singers
Welsh jazz singers